Polná is a town in Jihlava District in the Vysočina Region of the Czech Republic. It has about 5,100 inhabitants. The historic town centre is well preserved and is protected by law as an urban monument zone.

Administrative parts
Villages of Hrbov, Janovice, Nové Dvory and Skrýšov are administrative parts of Polná.

Geography
It lies in the Upper Sázava Hills. It is situated at the confluence of the small river Šlapanka and stream Ochozský. The territory is rich in fish ponds. The largest of them is Peklo, located next to the historic town centre.

History

Middle Ages
Founded in the second half of the 12th century, the first written mention of Polná is from 1242. At that time, there was already a church in Polná. Originally, Polná was a forest collier settlement, and not far from it there was built a castle called Polná, originally Polmna. The town lies on the line between two historic Czech lands – Bohemia and Moravia, therefore the town became an important mercantil and tactical point.

Polná became the centre of Polná (later Polná-Přibyslav) domain. During its existence, most of the time, Polná was part of significant aristocrat families' property. After the lords of Polná, the lords of Lipá owned the town, from the half of the 14th century Polná was owned by the lords of Pirkenštejn. During the Hussite Wars, Hynek Ptáček of Pirkenštejn, a hussite nobleman, ruled over Polná and bought also the nearby town of Přibyslav. Victor, son of the Czech king George of Poděbrady who bestowed Polná significant town rights and the coat of arms, got Polná by marriage with Žofie Ptáčková (daughter of Hynek Ptáček).

15th–18th century
In the 15th century, Trčeks of Lípa owned the town followed by the Wallensteins, lords of Hradec and Žejdlices of Šenfeld. In 1623 Rudolf Žejdlic's property was confiscated because of his revolt against the Emperor. All the domain was bought by cardinal František of Ditrichštejn who changed the town's privileges and the coat of arms. Polná belonged to the Ditrichštejns' property almost 300 years.

In the 17th century a Jewish community settled in Polná. The Jewish quarter was established in 1681.

In 1794 the castle (rebuilt to a chateau) burned down and was never completely restored again.

19th century
In the 19th century Polná was the centre of Czech culture for large locality and formed a counterbalance to the German-speaking city of Jihlava. In the half of the 19th century 6,500 people lived in Polná, which made it the third largest town in the Vysočina Region (after Jihlava and Třebíč).

In August 1863, a tragedy took place in Polná. A giant fire destroyed 189 houses and 456 families lost their homes. Many baroque and renaissance houses were ruined. Many people moved from the town. The fact that the Northwest Railroad were built 6 kilometers far from Polná caused another economical decline of the town. Railroad Dobronín-Polná was built in 1903 but since 1982 the passenger traffic does not carry on.

The most significant incident of the 19th century was the murder of 19-year-old Anežka Hrůzová in the Březina forest. A Polná Jew, Leopold Hilsner, was wrongfully accused of the crime. Tomáš Garrigue Masaryk, later the first president of Czechoslovakia, engaged himself in this affair.

20th century
In 1906, the telephone network were installed in Polná. A power plant was built in 1911. During the World War II most of the Jewish community died in concentration camps. Only three Polná Jews survived the war.

In 1949, Polná became part of the Havlíčkův Brod District. After another territorial reorganization in 1960, it became part of the Jihlava District.

Demographics

Economy
Polná is a town with many medium-sized industries. Most important types of industries are wood-working industry and food industry (especially dairy products). The largest employers with headquarters in the town are Sapeli, a.s. (manufacturer of doors) and TKZ Polná s.r.o. (manufacturer of building and furniture hardware).

Culture
Every second weekend in September, the so-called "carrot fun fair" or "carrot-bun fun fair" is organized in Polná.

Sights

Polná Castle was built in the late 12th or early 13th century and is among the oldest aristocratic castles in the country. It was rebuilt to a large gothic castle. During the rule of Count Viktorin in 1479–1486, the castle rampart was extended and Peklo Pond next to the castle was created. After a fire in 1584, the castle was reconstructed and partially transformed into a Renaissance chateau. During the Thirty Years' War, it was damaged by Swedish army. After a vast fire in 1794, some parts of it were not restored. In 1922–1926, the desotaled complex was partially reconstructed and museum exhibits were moved here. In 1953, it became a property of the town. Today the complex houses the Town Museum, a elementary art school, or a cultural centre.

Husovo Square forms the centre of the town. On the square there are deanery with the "Kaplanka" building (the former seat of the vicariate), Baroque Trinity Column and "Hastrmanka" Fountain, colloquially called "Vodník" (water sprite).

Church of Assumption of the Virgin Mary on the Husovo Square is the main landmark of Polná. It was built between 1700 and 1707. Author of the project was Italian builder Domenico D'Angeli. Inside the church there is a rich and valuable stucco and fresco decoration, or an organ by Jan David Sieber (the biggest preserved organ in the country manufactured in the Czech lands). The tower was destroyed by the 1863 fire and rebuilt in 1894.

Church of Saint Catherine is a cemetery church 1378–1389 by lords of Pirkenštejn. In 1906–1910 fragments of wall frescoes from the 15th and 16th centuries were discovered. The second cemetery church in Polná is Church of Saint Barbara.

The Jewish community is commemorated by the former synagogue and Jewish cemetery, both founded in the late 17th century. Nowadays the synagogue houses the Regional Museum of Jewish Culture.

Klešter is a glen where an ancient merchant path from Moravia to Bohemia led. It is a unique technical monument of the Middle Ages. About  of the glen is preserved.

Notable people
Božena Němcová (1820–1862), writer; lived here in 1840–1842
Leopold Hilsner (1876–1928), victim of judicial error
Bohumil Hrabal (1914–1997), writer; lived here in 1917–1919

Twin towns – sister cities

Polná is twinned with:
 Wimmis, Switzerland

References

External links

Cities and towns in the Czech Republic
Populated places in Jihlava District